Buprestis maculipennis is a species of metallic wood-boring beetle in the family Buprestidae. It is found in North America.

Subspecies
These three subspecies belong to the species Buprestis maculipennis:
 Buprestis maculipennis deficiens Casey
 Buprestis maculipennis fusiformis Casey
 Buprestis maculipennis maculipennis

References

Further reading

 
 
 

Buprestidae
Articles created by Qbugbot
Beetles described in 1840